The Bell Island Group is a Group of marine sedimentary strata cropping out in Bell Island, Newfoundland.

References

Ordovician Newfoundland and Labrador